Liu Ruming, Liu Ju-ming, 刘汝明; 12 May 1895 – 28 April 1975) was a ROC Army general during the Warlord Era, Second Sino-Japanese War and Chinese Civil War.

Overview 

Born in Hebei province, he became an important military officer in Feng Yuxiang's Northwestern Army. After the 1930 Central Plains War he took the post of 29th Army Deputy commander.  He became Chairman of the government of Chahar Province in June 1936, holding it until October 1938.

In July 1937 he was commander of the 143rd Division, at the outbreak of the Second Sino-Japanese War. Later during Operation Chahar he commanded the defense of the provincial capital of Kalgan with the 7th Army Group Detachment as the Deputy commander of 7th Army in addition to command of his division. From then on he commanded the 68th Corps in the later phase of the Peiping – Hankow Railway Operation, and during many of the important battles in the war, the Battle of Xuzhou, Battle of Wuhan, Battle of Suixian-Zaoyang, Battle of Zaoyang-Yichang, Battle of South Henan.

During the Battle of Henan-Hunan-Guangxi, at the time of the Battle of West Henan-North Hubei in 1945 he was in command of the Western Henan Garrison and Western Henan Forces, the 2nd Army Group.

During the Chinese Civil War in 1948, he was in command of 8th Army in the disastrous Huaihai Campaign. His army tried but failed to relieve other trapped forces in the battle.

In 1949 he moved to Taiwan along with the Nationalist government. In 1952 he retired, and he died on April 28, 1975, in Taipei.

Sources 
 Hsu Long-hsuen and Chang Ming-kai, History of The Sino-Japanese War (1937–1945) 2nd Ed., 1971. Translated by Wen Ha-hsiung, Chung Wu Publishing; 33, 140th Lane, Tung-hwa Street, Taipei, Taiwan Republic of China.
 China; Administrative divisions
 Perleberg, Max, "Who's Who in Modern China" Hong Hong: Ye Olde Printerie, Ltd., 1954

1895 births
1975 deaths
National Revolutionary Army generals from Hebei
Recipients of the Order of Blue Sky and White Sun
People from Cangzhou
People of the Central Plains War